Tenagodus modestus is a species of sea snail, a marine gastropod mollusk in the family Siliquariidae.

Distribution

Description 
The maximum recorded shell length is 150 mm.

Habitat 
Minimum recorded depth is 37 m. Maximum recorded depth is 1472 m.

References

Siliquariidae
Gastropods described in 1881